Clivina pileolata is a species of ground beetle in the subfamily Scaritinae. It was described by Henry Walter Bates in 1892.

References

pileolata
Beetles described in 1892